Proleptic may refer to:
 Prolepsis, several meanings related to foreshadowing
 Proleptic calendar, a calendar that is applied to dates before its introduction
 Proleptic syllogism, a class of syllogism in logic